Menelaos Ponireas (born 1888, date of death unknown) was a Greek athlete. He competed in the men's triple jump at the 1920 Summer Olympics.

References

1888 births
Year of death missing
Athletes (track and field) at the 1920 Summer Olympics
Greek male triple jumpers
Olympic athletes of Greece
Place of birth missing